William John Bentley (born 21 October 1947) is an English former professional footballer who played as a left-back. He made a total of 439 league appearances in a 15-year career in the Football League.

Beginning his career at Stoke City in 1964, he moved on to Blackpool in 1968. He spent the next nine years with Blackpool, helping them to win promotion out of the Second Division in 1969–70, and to lift the Anglo-Italian Cup in 1971. He spent 1977 to 1980 at Port Vale, also briefly serving the club as caretaker-manager in 1979. He ended his career at non-league Stafford Rangers in 1981.

Career

Stoke City
Bentley began his career with Stoke City, signing as a professional with the club in October 1964. He made five First Division appearances in 1965–66 and seven appearances in 1966–67, before breaking into Tony Waddington's first team plans during the 1967–68 campaign, when he played a total of 37 games for the "Potters". The young defender's physique and temperament had won him comparisons to John Charles.

Blackpool
On 9 January 1969, five months into the 1968–69 season, he joined Stan Mortensen's Blackpool for £30,000. He made his debut for the club two days later, in a 3–2 home defeat by Charlton Athletic. The following season he helped the "Seasiders" win promotion to the First Division as runners-up of the Second Division under new manager Les Shannon. However they were immediately relegated in 1970–71. He was though part of the Blackpool team that won the Anglo-Italian Cup in 1971, beating Bologna in the final at the Stadio Renato Dall'Ara.

Blackpool finished sixth in 1971–72 under Bob Stokoe's stewardship, but reached the 1972 Anglo-Italian Cup final at the Stadio Olimpico, where they were beaten by Roma. They dropped to seventh place in 1972–73 under new boss Harry Potts, but reached the quarter-finals of the League Cup. Blackpool finished fifth in 1973–74, missing out on promotion by just three points. They again finished seventh in 1974–75, before falling to tenth in 1975–76. On 3 January 1976, Bentley scored a "stunning" winning goal against Burnley in the third round of the FA Cup, his only goal in eleven appearances in the competition for the club. Blackpool finished fifth in 1976–77 under new manager Allan Brown, finishing only four points behind promoted Chelsea. Bentley's final appearance for the club came on 7 May 1977, in a 1–1 draw at Hereford United. He made 296 league appearances and scored ten goals for Blackpool, for whom he was mostly used as a left-back but also had times playing in midfield.

Port Vale & Stafford Rangers
In July 1977 he was sold to Port Vale, as one of manager Roy Sproson's last signings. Upon his arrival at Vale Park, Bentley stated that "I am a Potteries lad and I want to play for the club. There is no question of me coming here to be put out to grass. I still think I have plenty to offer". He played 37 games in 1977–78, retaining his first team place under new boss Bobby Smith, as the "Valiants" slipped out of the Third Division. He made 34 appearances in the 1978–79 season, as new manager Dennis Butler took the club to a lowly finish of 16th in the Fourth Division. Bentley was placed in temporary charge of team affairs in December 1979 after newly appointed manager Alan Bloor unexpectedly resigned, and before a replacement in John McGrath was found. Despite playing 35 games in 1979–80, he was given a free transfer in May 1980. He moved on to Stafford Rangers, with whom he finished his professional career in 1981, after making 20 Alliance Premier League appearances in the 1980–81 season. After Rangers he became the player-manager of Fenton British Legion and Foley.

Style of play
Bentley, a former England Youth international, was known for being a tough-tackling defender. This was the source of the "Bill Bentley, Hatchet Man" chant that emanated from the stands during his time at Blackpool.

Post-retirement
Bentley later became a window cleaner in the Trentham area of his hometown of Stoke-on-Trent.

Career statistics

Managerial statistics

Honours
Blackpool
Football League Second Division second-place promotion: 1969–70
Anglo-Italian Cup: 1971; runner-up: 1972

References

Further reading
 

1947 births
Living people
Footballers from Stoke-on-Trent
Association football fullbacks
English footballers
Stoke City F.C. players
Blackpool F.C. players
Port Vale F.C. players
Stafford Rangers F.C. players
English Football League players
National League (English football) players
Association football player-managers
English football managers
Port Vale F.C. managers
English Football League managers